Thurinjapuram is a Panchayat town in Tiruvanamalai district, Tamil Nadu India. It is in Thiruvannamalai Taluk and has a population of 14000 and altitude of 181 m.  It is rewarded as a 3rd grade town Panchayat in 1956 and second grade town in 1989 and first grade in 2003.

Cities and towns in Tiruvannamalai district